Pi Coronae Borealis, Latinized from π Coronae Borealis, is a solitary, orange-hued star in the northern constellation of Corona Borealis. Its apparent magnitude is 5.58, which is bright enough to be faintly visible to the naked eye. Based upon an annual parallax shift of 13.40 mas as measured from Earth, it is located about 243 light years from the Sun. The star is moving closer to the Sun with a radial velocity of −5 km/s. It is most likely (98% chance) a member of the thin disk population.

This is an evolved G-type giant star with a stellar classification of G9 III:, where the ':' indicates some uncertainty about the classification. (Bartkevicius and Lazauskaite (1997) classify it as K0 III.) The star has 1.61 times the mass of the Sun and has expanded to about 10 times the Sun's radius. The abundance of iron is lower than in the Sun: the star is considered metal deficient. It is around 4.6 billion years old and is radiating 39 times the Sun's luminosity from its enlarged photosphere at an effective temperature of 4,667 K.

References

G-type giants
Corona Borealis
Coronae Borealis, Pi
Durchmusterung objects
Coronae Borealis, 09
140716
077048
5855